Carlo d'Aragona Tagliavia (Castelvetrano, Sicily, 1530 – Madrid, 25 September 1599) was a Sicilian-Spanish nobleman and viceroy. 

He was the son of a Sicilian peer, Giovanni Tagliavia, count of Castelvetrano, and a Spanish mother, Beatriz de Aragón y Cruillas, only daughter of Carlos de Aragon, Marquess of Avola. He became Duca di Terranova (in the Italian, not Spanish line) on 17 August 1561.  

He was a Knight of the Order of Aviz, the governor of the Duchy of Milan from 1583 to 1592, and Viceroy of Sicily two times, in 1556–1568 and 1571–1577. He was also Viceroy of Catalonia in 1581–1582, and Knight in the Order of the Golden Fleece in 1585. 

He married Margherita Ventimiglia and Cardinal Simeone Tagliavia d'Aragona was his son.
He was succeeded as Duke of Terranova by his grandson Carlos Tagliavia de Aragón (died 1605).

References

External links
Geni.com

1520s births
1599 deaths
Clergy from Palermo
Margraves of Italy
Knights of the Golden Fleece
Viceroys of Sicily
Viceroys of Catalonia
Governors of the Duchy of Milan